Barbodes montanoi is a species of cyprinid fish endemic to the island of Mindanao, the Philippines. It is commonly known as pait, pait-pait, or paitan, along with other native Barbodes species. This species can reach a length of  TL. It is silvery greenish-gray in color and is characterized by a body pattern of two to six black dots or dashes (depending on the development stage). The fins are yellowish to reddish in color. The species is named after the French naturalist and explorer Joseph Montano.

References

Barbodes
Fish described in 1881
Endemic fauna of the Philippines